Kherbet Kiyar is a village in al-Bab District in northern Aleppo Governorate, northwestern Syria.

References

Populated places in al-Bab District